With a Song in My Heart may refer to:

With a Song in My Heart (film), a 1952 movie biography of Jane Froman, starring Susan Hayward
""With a Song in My Heart" (song), a 1929 popular song by Richard Rodgers and Lorenz Hart, revived in 1948
With a Song in My Heart (Stevie Wonder album), 1963
With a Song in My Heart (John Pizzarelli album), 2008